The Palenque poison frog (Paruwrobates erythromos) is a species of frog in the family Dendrobatidae endemic to Ecuador.
Its natural habitats are subtropical or tropical moist lowland forests and rivers. It is threatened by habitat loss.

References

Poison dart frogs
Amphibians of Ecuador
Endemic fauna of Ecuador
Amphibians described in 1980
Taxonomy articles created by Polbot